LMP may refer to:

Business and organizations
 LMP – Hungary's Green Party (Lehet más a politika), a political party in Hungary formed in 2009 from a civilian initiative
 Lampedusa Airport, an airport in Lampedusa, Italy with IATA code LMP
 London Metropolitan Police, also known as the Metropolitan Police Service (MPS), the police force responsible for law enforcement within Greater London, excluding the City of London

Music
 La Musique Populaire, an American indiepop band
 Limb Music Products & Publishing (LMP), an independent record label based in Hamburg, Germany
 Lisa Marie Presley, an American singer-songwriter and daughter of Elvis and Priscilla Presley
 London Mozart Players, a British classical chamber orchestra based in Croydon, England

Sports
 Le Mans Prototype, a type of custom-built race car intended for sports car racing and endurance racing
 Liga Mexicana del Pacifico, a Mexican winter baseball league

Science
 Larson-Miller parameter, prediction of the effects of time and temperature on materials
 Epstein–Barr virus latent membrane protein 1, an EBV protein that regulates its own expression and the expression of human genes
 Epstein–Barr virus latent membrane protein 2, an EBV transmembrane protein

Technology
 Link Manager Protocol, a protocol for initiating and controlling the link between Bluetooth terminals
 Lithium Metal Polymer battery, a type of lithium-ion polymer battery
 Lunar Module Pilot, the pilot of Apollo Lunar Module during Apollo program missions

Other uses
 Licensed massage practitioner, or Licensed massage therapist
 Last menstrual period, see Gestational age, the first day of the menstrual period prior to conceiving, used to calculate expected date of delivery
 Last mile provider, provider of the final leg of a telecommunications network terminating at the subscriber's premises
 Lemon meringue pie, a dessert consisting of lemon curd and meringue fillings in a shortcrust pastry
 "Like My Post", an invitation for readers to request an action by providing single-click feedback on a social website
 Locational marginal pricing, also known as nodal pricing, a pricing concept used in some deregulated electricity markets

See also
 Lmp1 (disambiguation)